Viasat Ukraine is a Ukrainian direct broadcast satellite television distributor. It is owned by "Vision TV". It competes with NTV Plus Ukraine and Poverkhnost which broadcast on the Eutelsat system.

The service was launched April 21, 2008  using DVB-S & DVB-S2 transponders on the Astra 4A, Hot Bird and AMOS satellites to broadcast channels compressed with MPEG-2 & MPEG-4 AVC codecs.

References

External links 
 
Channel and transponder list

Modern Times Group
Direct broadcast satellite services
Ukrainian companies established in 2008